Charles E. Cole (born October 10, 1927) was the Attorney General of Alaska from December 1990 until January 1994.

Early career
Cole came to Alaska in 1954, and commenced his personal law practice in 1957.

Attorney General
Cole served as Attorney General of Alaska during the second governorship of Wally Hickel. He was honored by the Alaska Bar Association for his service for the state as Attorney General in 2011.

References

External links
 Charlie Cole at PannerVault.com, honoring Cole's contributions to the Alaska Goldpanners of Fairbanks and baseball in Interior Alaska in general

1927 births
20th-century American lawyers
Alaska Attorneys General
Alaska Republicans
Living people
Oregon State University alumni
Politicians from Fairbanks, Alaska
Politicians from Yakima, Washington
Stanford Law School alumni
Stanford University alumni
Lawyers from Fairbanks, Alaska